Carel 'Tossie' Fourie (1 August 1950 – 5 May 1997) was a South African rugby union player.

Playing career
Fourie scored 22 tries during the tour, the most by a Gazelles player and ten more than second most scored by Gerrie Germishuys. His 92 points scored, were the second most points for the South Africans, behind the 110 scored by Jackie Snyman.

Fourie toured with the Springboks to France in 1974 and made his test debut against France on 23 November 1974 in Toulouse. He played in both test matches on the French tour and a further two tests during the return tour of the French to South Africa in 1975. He scored ten points in test matches and also played in five tour matches, scoring a further four points.

Test history

Accolades
Fourie was named one of the five SA Rugby players of the Year for 1972. The four other players named, were two members of the 1972 England team that toured South Africa, namely Sam Doble and John Pullin, as well as the South African lock forward, Kevin de Klerk and flanker Jan Ellis.

See also
List of South Africa national rugby union players – Springbok no.  481

References

1950 births
1997 deaths
South African rugby union players
South Africa international rugby union players
Eastern Province Elephants players
People from Uitenhage
Rugby union players from the Eastern Cape
Rugby union wings